Phlyaria is a genus of butterflies in the family Lycaenidae. It is monotypic, consisting of only one species, Phlyaria cyara, the pied blue, which is found in Guinea, Sierra Leone, Liberia, Ivory Coast, Ghana, Togo, Nigeria, Cameroon, Gabon, the Republic of the Congo, the Central African Republic, Angola, the Democratic Republic of the Congo, Uganda, Kenya and Tanzania. The habitat consists of forests.

The larvae feed on the young shoots of Albizia gummifera.

Subspecies
Phlyaria cyara cyara (Nigeria: Cross River loop, Cameroon, Gabon, Congo, Central African Republic, Angola, Democratic Republic of the Congo: Mongala, Uele, Tshopo, Equateur, Sankuru, Lualaba)
Phlyaria cyara stactalla Karsch, 1895 (Guinea, Sierra Leone, Liberia, Ivory Coast, Ghana, Togo, western Nigeria)
Phlyaria cyara tenuimarginata (Grünberg, 1908) (Uganda, western and central Kenya, Democratic Republic of the Congo: east to Ituri and North Kivu, western Tanzania)

References

Seitz, A. Die Gross-Schmetterlinge der Erde 13: Die Afrikanischen Tagfalter. Plate XIII 72

Polyommatini
Monotypic butterfly genera
Taxa named by Ferdinand Karsch
Lycaenidae genera